Subotica is a city and the administrative center of the North Bačka District in the autonomous province of Vojvodina, Serbia. Formerly the largest city of Vojvodina region, contemporary Subotica is now the second largest city in the province, following the city of Novi Sad. According to the 2011 census, the city itself has a population of 97,910, while the urban area of Subotica (with adjacent urban settlement of Palić included) has 105,681 inhabitants, and the population of metro area (the administrative area of the city) stands at 141,554 people.

Name
The name of the city has changed frequently over time. The earliest known written name of the city was Zabotka or Zabatka, which dates from 1391. It is the origin of the current Hungarian name for the city "Szabadka". Other sources claim, that the name "Szabadka" comes from the adjective szabad, which derived from the Slavic word for "free" – svobod, referring to the status of the colonists settled in this zone by the Habsburg after the Battle of Zenta.

The town was named in the 1740s after Maria Theresa of Austria, Archduchess of Austria. It was officially called Sent-Maria in 1743, but was renamed in 1779 as Maria-Theresiapolis. These two official names were also spelled in several different ways (most commonly the German Maria-Theresiopel or Theresiopel), and were used in different languages.

Geography
It is located in the vicinity of lake Palić.

Climate 
Subotica has a warm-summer humid continental climate (Dfb) that is uncommon in Serbia except at higher elevations,

History

Prehistory and antiquity
In the Neolithic and Eneolithic periods, several important archaeological cultures flourished in this area, including the Starčevo culture, the Vinča culture, and the Tiszapolgár culture. Early Indo-European peoples settled in the territory of present-day Subotica in 3200 BC. During the Eneolithic period, the Bronze Age and the Iron Age, several Indo-European archaeological cultures included areas around Subotica - the Baden culture, the Vučedol culture, the Urnfield culture and some others. Before the Iazyge conquest in the 1st century BC, Indo-European peoples of Illyrian, Celtic and Dacian descent inhabited this area. In the 3rd century BC, this area was controlled by the Celtic Boii and Eravisci, while in the 1st century BC, it became part of the Dacian kingdom. From the 1st century BC, the area came under the control of the Sarmatian Iazyges, who were sometimes allies and sometimes enemies of the Romans. Iazyge rule lasted until the 4th century AD, after which the region came into the possession of various other peoples and states.

Early Middle Ages and Slavic settlement
In the Early Middle Ages various Indo-European and Turkic peoples and states ruled in the area of Subotica. These peoples included Huns, Gepids, Avars, Slavs and Bulgarians. Slavs settled today's Subotica in the 6th and 7th centuries, before some of them crossed the rivers Sava and Danube and settled in the Balkans.

The Slavic tribe living in the territory of present-day Subotica were the Obotrites, a subgroup of the Serbs. In the 9th century, after the fall of the Avar state, the first forms of Slavic statehood emerged in this area. The first Slavic states that ruled over this region included the Principality of Lower Pannonia (846-875), Great Moravia (833– 907) and the Bulgarian Empire.

Late-Middle Ages

Subotica probably first became a settlement of note when people poured into it from nearby villages destroyed during the Tatar invasions of 1241–42. When Zabadka/Zabatka was first recorded in 1391, it was a tiny town in the medieval Kingdom of Hungary. Later, the city belonged to the Hunyadis, one of the most influential aristocratic families in the whole of Central Europe.

King Matthias Corvinus of Hungary gave the town to one of his relatives, János Pongrác Dengelegi, who, fearing an invasion by the Ottoman Empire, fortified the castle of Subotica, erecting a fortress in 1470. Some decades later, after the Battle of Mohács in 1526, Subotica became part of the Ottoman Empire. The majority of the Hungarian population fled northward to Royal Hungary. Bálint Török, a local noble who had ruled over Subotica, also escaped from the city. During the military and political havoc following the defeat at Mohács, Subotica came under the control of Serbian mercenaries recruited in Banat. These soldiers were in the service of the Transylvanian general John I Zápolya, a later Hungarian king.

The leader of these mercenaries, Jovan Nenad, established in 1526–27 his rule in Bačka, northern Banat and a small part of Syrmia and created an independent entity, with Subotica as its administrative centre. At the peak of his power, Jovan Nenad proclaimed himself as Serbian tsar in Subotica. He named Radoslav Čelnik as the general commander of his army, while his treasurer and palatine was Subota Vrlić, a Serbian noble from Jagodina. When Bálint Török returned and recaptured Subotica from the Serbs, Jovan Nenad moved the administrative centre to Szeged.

Some months later, in the summer of 1527, Jovan Nenad was assassinated and his entity collapsed. However, after Jovan Nenad's death, Radoslav Čelnik led a part of the army to Ottoman Syrmia, where he briefly ruled as an Ottoman vassal.

Ottoman administration

The Ottoman Empire ruled the city from 1542 to 1686. At the end of this almost 150-year-long period, not much remained of the old town of Zabadka/Zabatka. As much of the population had fled, the Ottomans encouraged the settlement of the area by different colonists from the Balkans. The settlers were mostly Orthodox Serbs. They cultivated the extremely fertile land around Subotica. In 1570, the population of Subotica numbered 49 houses, and in 1590, 63 houses. In 1687, the region was settled by Catholic Dalmatas (called Bunjevci today). It was called Sobotka under Ottoman rule and was a kaza centre in Segedin sanjak at first in Budin Eyaleti until 1596, and after that in Eğri Eyaleti between 1596 and 1686.

Habsburg administration

In 1687, about 5,000 Bunjevci settled in Bačka (including Subotica). After the decisive battle against the Ottomans at Senta led by Prince Eugene of Savoy on 11 September 1697, Subotica became part of the military border zone Theiss-Mieresch established by the Habsburg monarchy. In the meantime the uprising of Francis II Rákóczi broke out, which is also known as the Kuruc War.

In the region of Subotica, Rákóczi joined battle against the Rac National Militia. Rác was a designation for the South Slavic people (mostly Serbs and Bunjevci) and they often were referred to as rácok in the Kingdom of Hungary. In a later period rácok came to mean, above all, Serbs of Orthodox religion.

The Serbian military families enjoyed several privileges thanks to their service for the Habsburg Monarchy. Subotica gradually, however, developed from being a mere garrison town to becoming a market town with its own civil charter in 1743. When this happened, many Serbs complained about the loss of their privileges. The majority left the town in protest and some of them founded a new settlement just outside 18th century Subotica in Aleksandrovo, while others emigrated to Russia. In New Serbia, a new Russian province established for them, those Serbs founded a new settlement and also named it Subotica. In 1775, a Jewish community in Subotica was established.

It was perhaps to emphasise the new civic serenity of Subotica that the pious name Saint Mary came to be used for it at this time. Some decades later, in 1779, Empress Maria Theresa of Austria advanced the town's status further by proclaiming it a Free Royal Town. The enthusiastic inhabitants of the city renamed Subotica once more as Maria-Theresiopolis.

This Free Royal Town status gave a great impetus to the development of the city. During the 19th century, its population doubled twice, attracting many people from all over the Habsburg monarchy. This led eventually to a considerable demographic change. In the first half of the 19th century, the Bunjevci had still been in the majority, but there was an increasing number of Hungarians and Jews settling in Subotica. This process was not stopped even by the outbreak of the Revolutions in the Habsburg monarchy (1848–49).

1848/1849 Revolutions

During the 1848-49 revolution, the proclaimed borders of autonomous Serbian Vojvodina included Subotica, but Serb troops could not establish control in the region. On 5 March 1849, at the locality named Kaponja (between Tavankut and Bajmok), there was a battle between the Serb and Hungarian armies, which was won by the Hungarians.

The first newspaper in the town was also published during the 1848/49 revolution—it was called Honunk állapota ("State of Our Homeland") and was published in Hungarian by Károly Bitterman's local printing company. Unlike most Serbs and Croats who confronted the Hungarians, part of the local Bunjevci people supported the Hungarian revolution.

In 1849, after the Hungarian revolution of 1848 was defeated by the Russian and Habsburg armies, the town was separated from the Kingdom of Hungary together with most of the Bačka region, and became part of a separate Habsburg province, called Voivodeship of Serbia and Banat of Temeschwar. The administrative centre of this new province was Timișoara. The province existed until 1860. During the existence of the voivodeship, in 1853, Subotica acquired its impressive theatre.

Hungarian administration
After the establishment of the Dual-Monarchy in 1867, there followed what is often called the "golden age" of city development of Subotica. Many schools were opened after 1867 and in 1869 the railway connected the city to the world. In 1896 an electrical power plant was built, further enhancing the development of the city and the whole region. Subotica now adorned itself with its remarkable Central European, fin de siècle architecture. In 1902 a Jewish synagogue was built in the Art Nouveau style.

Between 1849 and 1860 it was part of the Voivodeship of Serbia and Banat of Temeschwar.

Yugoslavia and Serbia

Subotica had been part of Austria-Hungary until the end of World War I. In 1918, the city became part of the Kingdom of Serbs, Croats and Slovenes. As a result, Subotica became a border-town in Yugoslavia and did not, for a time, experience again the same dynamic prosperity it had enjoyed prior to World War I. However, during that time, Subotica was the third-largest city in Yugoslavia by population, following Belgrade and Zagreb.

In 1941, Yugoslavia was invaded and partitioned by the Axis Powers, and its northern parts, including Subotica, were annexed by Hungary. The annexation was not considered legitimate by the international community and the city was de jure still part of Yugoslavia. The Yugoslav government in exile received formal recognition of legitimacy as the representative of the country. On 11 April 1941, the Hungarian troops arrived in Subotica on the grounds that the majority of the people living in the city were ethnic Hungarians, which had been part of the Kingdom of Hungary for over 600 years. During World War II, the city lost approximately 7,000 of its citizens, mostly Serbs, Hungarians and Jews. Before the war about 6,000 Jews had lived in Subotica; many of these were deported from the city during the Holocaust, mostly to Auschwitz. In April 1944, under German administration, a ghetto was set up. In addition, many communists were executed during Axis rule. In 1944, the Axis forces left the city, and Subotica became part of the new Yugoslavia. During the 1944–45 period, about 8,000 citizens  (mainly Hungarians) were killed by Partisans while re-taking the city as a retribution for supporting Axis Hungary.

In the post-war period, Subotica has gradually been modernised. During the Yugoslav and Kosovo wars of the 1990s, a considerable number of Serb refugees came to the city from Croatia, Bosnia and Herzegovina, and Kosovo, while many ethnic Hungarians and Croats, as well as some local Serbs, left the region.

Cityscape

Unique in Serbia, Subotica and adjacent Palić have the most buildings built in the Hungarian Secession style, a distinct variant of Art Nouveau. The Hungarian Secession style was operational between the 1890s and World War I. Its designs combined art nouveau vegetal ornaments and symbolic figures with traditional Hungarian motifs. It found its architectural expression in Subotica in the works of Marcell Komor, Dezső Jakab and Ferenc Raichle.

The City Hall (built in 1908–1910) and the Synagogue (1902) are of especially outstanding beauty. These were built by the same architects, Marcell Komor and Dezső Jakab. Another exceptional example of art nouveau architecture is the actual Raichle Palace, which was built in 1904 by Ferenc J. Raichle.

Church buildings include the Cathedral of St. Theresa of Avila dating from 1797, the Franciscan friary dating from 1723, the Eastern Orthodox churches also from the 18th century, and the Hungarian Art Nouveau Subotica Synagogue from the early 20th century and its renovation was completed in the summer of 2019.

The historic National Theatre in Subotica, which was built in 1854 as the first monumental public building in Subotica, was demolished in 2007, although it was declared a historic monument under state protection in 1983, and in 1991 it was added to the National Register as a monument of an extraordinary cultural value. It is currently in the midst of renovation and is scheduled to open in 2017.

Neighborhoods

The following are the neighborhoods of Subotica:
Aleksandrovo
Bajnat (Bajnát)
Centar (Központ)
Dudova Šuma (Radijalac) (Sétaerdő)
Gat (Gát)
Graničar (Határőr)
Ker (Kér)
Kertvaroš (Kertváros)
Makova Sedmica (Makkhetes)
Mali Bajmok (Kisbajmok)
Mali Radanovac (Kisradanovác)
Novi Grad (Újváros)
Novo Naselje (Újtelep)
Prozivka (Prozivka)
Srpski Šor (Szerb sor)
Teslino Naselje
Veliki Radanovac (Nagyradanovác)
Zorka (Zorka)
Željezničko Naselje (Vasutastelep)

Suburbs and villages

The administrative area of Subotica comprises Subotica proper, the town of Palić and 17 villages. The villages are:
Bački Vinogradi (Bácsszőlős)
Bačko Dušanovo (Zentaörs)
Bajmok (Bajmok)
Bikovo (Békova)
Čantavir (Csantavér)
Donji Tavankut (Alsótavankút)
Đurđin (Györgyén)
Gornji Tavankut (Felsőtavankút)
Hajdukovo (Hajdújárás)
Kelebija (Alsókelebia)
Ljutovo (Mérges)
Mala Bosna (Kisbosznia)
Mišićevo (Hadikörs)
Novi Žednik (Újnagyfény)
Stari Žednik (Nagyfény)
Šupljak (Ludas)
Višnjevac (Meggyes)

Demographics

According to the 2011 census results, the city administrative area of Subotica had 141,554 inhabitants.

Ethnic composition
Places with either an absolute or relative Hungarian ethnic majority are: Subotica (Hungarian: Szabadka), Palić (Hungarian: Palicsfürdő), Hajdukovo (Hungarian: Hajdújárás), Bački Vinogradi (Hungarian: Bácsszőlős), Šupljak (Hungarian: Alsóludas), Čantavir (Hungarian: Csantavér), Bačko Dušanovo (Hungarian: Zentaörs), and Kelebija (Hungarian: Alsókelebia). Places with an absolute or relative Serb ethnic majority are: Bajmok, Višnjevac, Novi Žednik, and Mišićevo. Places with a relative ethnic majority Croat are: Mala Bosna, Đurđin, Donji Tavankut, Gornji Tavankut, Bikovo, Stari Žednik. Ljutovo has a relative Bunjevac ethnic majority.

The ethnic composition of the municipality:

Languages
Languages spoken in Subotica administrative area:
 Serbian = 63,412 (44.80%)
 Hungarian = 50,621 (35.76%)
 Bunjevac = 6,313 (4.46%)
 Croatian = 5,758 (4.07%)
 Others

Serbian is the most employed language in daily life, but Hungarian is also used by over one third of the population in their daily conversations. Both languages are also widely employed in commercial and official signage

Religion

Religion in the Subotica administrative area as of the 2011 census:
 Roman Catholic = 81,532 (57.60%)
 Orthodox = 39,333 (27.79%)
 Muslim = 2,756 (1.95%)
 Protestant = 2,372 (1.68%)
 Judaism = 89 (0.001%)

Subotica is the centre of the Roman Catholic diocese of the Bačka region. The Subotica area has the highest concentration of Catholics in Serbia. 57% of the city's population are Catholic. There are eight Catholic parish churches, a Franciscan spiritual centre (the city has communities of both Franciscan friars and Franciscan nuns), a female Dominican community, and two congregations of Augustinian religious sisters. The diocese of Subotica has the only Catholic secondary school in Serbia (Paulinum).

When the nuns' orphanage and children's home in Blato, Korčula (present-day Croatia) had exhausted the food and funds needed for helping poor and hungry children, Marija Petković (later known as Blessed Mary of Jesus Crucified Petković), went to 
Bačka, whose apostolic seat is Subotica, to solicit help for orphans and widows. Bishop Ljudevit Lajčo Budanović asked Petković to found monasteries of her Order in Subotica and neighbourhood, so the locals could benefit spiritually from the instruction of the nuns of her Order. She learned that Bačka had many poor and abandoned children. In 1923, she opened Kolijevka, a children's home in Subotica. The home still exists but is no longer run by nuns.

Among other Christian communities, the members of the Serbian Orthodox Church are the most numerous. There are two Orthodox church buildings in the city. Orthodox Christians in Subotica belong to the Eparchy of Bačka of the Serbian Orthodox Church. Subotica has two Protestant churches as well, Lutheran and Calvinist. The Jewish community of Subotica is the third largest in Serbia, after those in Belgrade and Novi Sad. About 1000 (of the 6,000 pre-WWII Jews of Subotica) survived the Holocaust. According to the 2011 census, fewer than 90 Jews remained in Subotica as of 2011.

Politics

Results of 2020 local elections in Subotica municipality:
 For Our Children: 43,4
 Alliance of Vojvodina Hungarians: 30,6%
 Subotica Citizens Movement: 6,4%
 Socialist Party of Serbia: 5,5%
 United for a Democratic Subotica: 5,36%
 Bunjevci Citizens of Serbia: 3,2%

Coat of arms
The original coat of arms and current medium coat of arms have an outlining Latin inscription of Civitatis Maria Theresiopolis, Sigillum Liberæque Et Regiæ, translated as Seal of the Free and Royal City of Maria Theresiopolis.

Economy

The area around Subotica is mainly farmland but the city itself is an important industrial and transportation centre in Serbia. Due to the surrounding farmlands Subotica has famous food producer industries in the country, including such brands as the confectionery factory "Pionir", "Fidelinka" the cereal manufacturer, "Mlekara Subotica" a milk producer and "Simex" producer of strong alcohol drinks.

There are a number of old socialistic industries that survived the transition period in Serbia. The biggest one is the chemical fertilizer factory "Azotara" and the rail wagon factory "Bratstvo". Currently the biggest export industry in town is the "Siemens Subotica" wind generators factory and it is the biggest brownfield investment so far. The other big companies in Subotica are: Fornetti, ATB Sever and Masterplast. More recent companies to come to Subotica include Dunkermotoren and NORMA Group. Tourism is important. In the past few years, Palić has been famous for the Palić Film Festival. Subotica is a festival city, hosting more than 17 festivals over the year. 

As of September 2017, Subotica has one of 14 free economic zones established in Serbia.

In 2020 construction of a new aqua park with ten pools and wellness and spa sections was underway in Palić.

The following table gives a preview of total number of registered people employed in legal entities per their core activity (as of 2018):

Education

Universities
Teacher Training Faculty in the Hungarian Language of the University of Novi Sad

Tutoring of teachers in Subotica dates back to the late 18th century. After the establishment of Austria-Hungary, the second state-financed teacher training faculty of Hungary was founded in Subotica, second to Buda only. Modern history of teacher training in Subotica started in 2006, when the Sombor Teacher Training Faculty's curriculums in the Hungarian language seceded from the faculty and became independent as the 14th faculty of the University of Novi Sad. As of 2022, the faculty offers bachelor's degrees in kindergarten teaching, elementary school teaching, disciplinatory teaching and communications, and master's degrees in kindergarten teaching and elementary school teaching.

Secondary schools
Polytechnic school, Surveying and Construction, Typography, Forestry and Wood Processing 
Teachers' College, founded in 1689, the oldest college in the country and region
"Svetozar Marković" grammar school 
"Dezső Kosztolányi" Philological grammar school 
"MEŠC" Electro-mechanical school, recently renamed to "Tehnička Škola - Subotica" (en. "Technical School") 
"Bosa Milićević" School of Economics
"Lazar Nešić" School of Chemistry
"Medicinska Škola" Medical School

4 953 students studied in the city in the year 2020/21 in the secondary education. 1 626 students chose Hungarian speaking classes (32.8%), 209 students chose Croatian classes while 3 118 students studied in Serbian language.

Historical schools (1920 to 1941)
Subotica Law School

Sport

Subotica has one major football stadium, the Subotica City Stadium, indoor arena and indoor swimming pool. The local football team is Spartak and plays in the Serbian SuperLiga, the country's primary football competition.

Media
Newspapers and magazines published in Subotica:
 Magyar Szó, daily newspaper in Hungarian, founded 1944, published in Subotica since 2006.
 Subotičke novine, main weekly newspaper in Serbian.
 Bunjevačke novine, in Bunjevac.
 Hrvatska riječ, in Croatian.
 Zvonik, in Croatian

Infrastructure

A1 motorway connects the city with Novi Sad and Belgrade to the south and, across the border with Hungary, with Szeged to the north. It runs alongside the Budapest–Belgrade railway, which connects it to major European cities. As of November 2022, the line is out of order without replacement as both the Serbian and the Hungarian part of the line is currently being reconstructed. Subotica also has branch line railway connections to Sombor, Senta (with passenger service), and Szeged through Horgoš (under reconstruction with limited freight service, passenger service planned to commence in late 2023), while the former branch line to Baja through Csikéria was dismantled in the 1960s but parts of the derelict tracks are still visible in the city's northwestern outskirts.

The city used to have a tram system, the Subotica tram system, but it was discontinued in 1974. The Subotica tram, put into operation in 1897, ran on electricity from the start. While neighbouring cities' trams at this date were often still horse-drawn, this gave the Subotica system an advantage over other municipalities including Belgrade, Novi Sad, Zagreb, and Szeged. Its existence was important for the citizens of Subotica, as well as tourists who came to visit.
Subotica has since developed a bus system, operated by JP Subotica Trans, who operates eleven city lines, eight suburban lines, and thirteen interurban lines, as well as a single international line to Szeged. Per year the buses travel some 4.7 million kilometres, and carry about ten million people.

The city is served by Subotica Airport; its runway is too short for airliners, limiting usage to mostly recreational aviation. Southwest of the city there is a 218.5 metres tall guyed mast for FM-/TV-broadcasting. It is the tallest of its kind in Serbia and one of the tallest in the region.

Famous citizens
Branimir Aleksić (born 1990), football player and member of the Serbia national football team
Sava Babić (1934–2012), writer, translator, and university professor
Géza Csáth (1887–1919), Hungarian writer, musician, music critic, psychiatrist, and physician
Gyula Cseszneky (born 1914), Hungarian, poet, voivode
Sreten Damjanović (born 1946), wrestler
Marko Dmitrović (born 1992), goalkeeper for the Serbia national football team and Spanish football club Eibar
Oliver Dulić (born 1975), politician
Vlatko Dulić (1943–2015), actor
Yehuda Elkana (born 1934), Israeli philosopher of science
Nikola Kalinić  (born 1991), Serbian basketball player, silver medalist at the Olympics and the FIBA World Cup
Zoran Kalinić (born 1958), table tennis champion
Danilo Kiš (1935–1989), writer
Juci Komlós (1919–2011), Hungarian actress
Dezső Kosztolányi (1885–1936), Hungarian poet and prose-writer
Zoran Kuntić (born 1967), Serbian retired professional footballer
Félix Lajkó (born 1974), world music violinist and composer
Péter Lékó (born 1979), Hungary's number one chess player
Szilveszter Lévai (born 1945), Hungarian composer
Aleksandar Lifka (1880–1952), central-European cinematographer
Bela Lugosi (1882–1956), actor
Boris Malagurski (born 1988), Serbian Canadian film director, producer, and TV host
Refik Memišević (1956–2004), wrestling champion
Đula Mešter (born 1972), volleyball player and Olympic champion
Jovan Mikić (1914–1944), leader of the Partisans in Subotica, and a national hero who was killed in 1944
Tihomir Ognjanov (1927–2006), Serbian footballer for the Yugoslavia national football team
Momir Petković (born 1953), wrestling champion
Bojana Radulović (born 1973), handball player
Mirna Radulović (born 1992), Serbian singer who represented Serbia in the Eurovision Song Contest 2013 as part of Moje 3
Eva Ras (born 1941), actress, painter, and writer
Magdolna Rúzsa (born 1985), Hungarian pop singer
Ivan Sarić (1876–1966), aviation pioneer and cyclist
Tibor Sekelj (Tibor Székely) (1912–1988), explorer, esperantist, writer
John Simon (1925–2019), American theatre critic
Davor Štefanek (born 1985), Serbian wrestler and Olympic champion
György Sztantics (1878–1918), racewalking champion at the Intercalated Games
Itzchak Tarkay (1935–2012), Israeli artist
Đorđe Tutorić (born 1983), Serbian professional football player
Ajs Nigrutin (born 1977), Serbian rapper.

International cooperation
 Subotica is a pilot city of the Council of Europe and the EU Intercultural cities programme.

Twin towns - Sister cities
Subotica is twinned with the following cities:

Partner Cities
Subotica is a partner city with the following:

See also
List of mayors of Subotica
Municipalities of Serbia
List of cities in Serbia
List of cities, towns and villages in Vojvodina
North Bačka District

References

Books

Sources
 Recent (2002) statistical information comes from the Serbian statistical office.
 Ethnic statistics:  , САОПШTЕЊЕ СН31, брoј 295 • год. LII, 24.12.2002, YU . Accessed 17 January 2006. On page 6–7, Становништво према националној или етничкој припадности по попису 2002. Statistics can be found on the lines for "Суботица" (Subotica).
 Language and religion statistics: Popis stanovništva, domaćinstava i stanova u 2002, . Accessed 17 January 2006. On page 11–12: СТАНОВНИШТВО ПРЕМА ВЕРОИСПОВЕСТИ, СТАНОВНИШТВО ПРЕМА МАТЕРЊЕМ ЈЕЗИКУ. Statistics can be found on the lines for "Суботица" (Subotica).
 Ferdinand, S. and F. Komlosi. 2017. The Use of Hungarian and Serbian in the City of Szabadka/Subotica: An Empirical Study, Hungarian Cultural Studies, Volume 10. Accessed 8 September 2017.

External links

 The official website of Subotica
 JP Subotica Trans - Public Transport Official Site
 Subotica's official website for tourism and travel information
 History of Subotica 
 Panoramic pictures from Subotica
 Subotica International Festival of Children's Theatres

 
Places in Bačka
Populated places in Vojvodina
Municipalities and cities of Vojvodina
North Bačka District
Former capitals of Serbia
Spatial Cultural-Historical Units of Great Importance
Starčevo–Körös–Criș culture